Cai Gundelach (5 February 1891 – 11 March 1954) was a Danish equestrian. He competed in the individual eventing at the 1928 Summer Olympics.

References

1891 births
1954 deaths
Danish male equestrians
Olympic equestrians of Denmark
Equestrians at the 1928 Summer Olympics
Sportspeople from Frederiksberg